My Mother's Early Lovers is a 1998 American drama film directed by Nora Jacobson and starring Sue Ball and George Woodard.  It is Jacobson's feature directorial debut and based on Sybil Smith semi-autobiographical novella of the same name.

Cast
Sue Ball
George Woodard
Molly Hickok
Gilman Rood
Dudley Rood
Kim Meredith
Kathy Blume
Jacob Crumbine
Emily Gartner
Michael Kenne

Release
The film premiered at the Angelika Film Center on September 24, 1998.

Reception
Ron Weiskind of the Pittsburgh Post-Gazette awarded the film two and a half stars.

References

External links
 

Films based on American novels
American drama films
1998 drama films
1998 films
1990s English-language films
1990s American films